Samuel Robertson Morley (May 12, 1932 - January 25, 2014) was an American football end in the National Football League for the Washington Redskins.  He played college football at Stanford University and was drafted in the 20th round of the 1954 NFL Draft.

After his NFL career, Morley became a family law attorney. He died on January 25, 2014, of congestive heart failure.

See also
 List of NCAA major college football yearly receiving leaders

References

1932 births
2014 deaths
American football wide receivers
Players of American football from Pasadena, California
Stanford Cardinal football players
Washington Redskins players